List of presidents of the Senate of the Dominican Republic. The president is elected for a one-year term, and can be re-elected. 

Dominican Republic has had upper chamber (bicameral legislature) 1844-1854, 1858-1861, 1865-1866, 1878-1880, and since 1908. 

Below is a complete list of office-holders from 1908:

References

 
Politics of the Dominican Republic
Legislative speakers
Dominican Republic